Grey Legacy is a science fiction webcomic by Wayne Wise and Fred Wheaton that was originally published in print form. The comic is hosted on Drunk Duck. The comic was among the first ever to win a Xeric Award in 1992.

Synopsis
Grey Legacy is about Greylock, a student at an interstellar academy, and his rise to fame. Roommate of Lesterfarr, Greylock meets alien Bilmar, who was captured by the university and who pretends to be mute and dumb in order to avoid attention. The three eventually team up in a series of interstellar adventures.

Development
Throughout the 1980s, Wayne Wise and Fred Wheaton created Grey Legacy as a series of minicomics. The series was eventually published in print as an anthology in 1992 thanks to a grant by the Xeric Foundation. Grey legacy became one of the first four comics to win the Xeric Grant, but the comic series was unable to gain any more significant success throughout the 1990s.

References

External links
Grey Legacy on Drunk Duck
Wayne Wise Homepage
Fred Wheaton Homepage

2000s webcomics
1992 comics debuts
Science fiction webcomics
American webcomics
Webcomics in print
2007 webcomic debuts